Otto Haug (24 July 1876 – 3 March 1948) was a Norwegian athlete. He competed in the polevault at the 1906 Intercalated Games.

References

1876 births
1948 deaths
Athletes from Oslo
Norwegian male pole vaulters
Olympic athletes of Norway
Athletes (track and field) at the 1906 Intercalated Games
20th-century Norwegian people